South International Expo Center Station, is a station on Line 6 and Line 16 of the Wuhan Metro. It entered revenue service on December 28, 2016. It is located in Hanyang District.

Station layout

References

Wuhan Metro stations
Line 6, Wuhan Metro
Line 16, Wuhan Metro
Railway stations in China opened in 2016